The Kenya national field hockey team represents Kenya in men's international field hockey competitions and is controlled by the Kenya Hockey Union.

Kenya had its best Hockey World Cup result in 1971 when it finished fourth. The home venue of the team is the City Park Hockey Stadium in Nairobi.

Tournament history

Summer Olympics
1956 – 10th place
1960 – 7th place
1964 – 6th place
1968 – 8th place
1972 – 13th place
1976 – Withdrew
1984 – 9th place
1988 – 12th place

World Cup
 1971 – 4th place
 1973 – 12th place

Africa Cup of Nations
 1974 – 
 1983 – 
 1989 – 
 1993 – 
 1996 – 
 2013 – 
 2017 – 4th place
 2022 – 4th place

African Games
1987 – 
1991 – 
1995 – 
1999 – 
 2023 – Qualified

African Olympic Qualifier
 2007 – 
 2011 – 4th place
 2015 – 
 2019 – 5th place

Commonwealth Games
1998 – 11th place

Notable players
Ranjeev Deol
Michael Omondi
Peter Akatsa
Chris Otambo
Paul Omany
Lucas Alubaha

See also
Kenya women's national field hockey team

References

External links
Official website
FIH profile
Kenya Field Hockey Statistics

African men's national field hockey teams
Field hockey
National team
Men's sport in Kenya